Alfredo Rico Cruz (born July 4, 1944 in Jerome, Arizona) is a former Major League Baseball outfielder.  He was signed by the Baltimore Orioles before the 1964 season, and later drafted by the Kansas City Royals from the Orioles in the 1968 rule V draft. (December 2, 1968)

He was called up by the expansion Royals from Triple-A Omaha when rosters expanded in September 1969.  Rico got into 12 games during his one month with Kansas City, including seven in the starting lineup.  He did an excellent job in the field, making no errors in 31 chances, including two innings as a third baseman.

Though he had a low batting average of .231 (6-for-26), he had a high on-base percentage of .429 because he also walked 9 times.

While playing again for Omaha, Rico was traded to the St. Louis Cardinals organization for second baseman Cookie Rojas on June 13, 1970.  Assigned to stay in the minors, he went to the Tulsa Oilers, also of the American Association.  He had an excellent season for Tulsa in 1971, batting .296 with 19 HR and 101 RBI, and was acquired by the Minnesota Twins organization on September 14.  He was listed on Minnesota's 1972 spring roster, but never again reached the major league level.

References

 1972 Baseball Register published by The Sporting News

External links
 Baseball Reference
 Retrosheet

1944 births
Living people
Arizona State Sun Devils baseball players
Baseball players from Arizona
Charleston Charlies players
Elmira Pioneers players
Florida Instructional League Orioles players
Fox Cities Foxes players
Kansas City Royals players
Major League Baseball outfielders
Miami Marlins (FSL) players
Omaha Royals players
People from Jerome, Arizona
Stockton Ports players
Tacoma Twins players  
Tiburones de La Guaira players
American expatriate baseball players in Venezuela
Tulsa Oilers (baseball) players
San Fernando High School alumni